The Kalinga Stadium is a multi-purpose International sports complex in Bhubaneswar, Odisha, India. Its foundation stone was laid by the former chief minister of Odisha Biju Patnaik in 1978. It is the home ground of the Indian Super League Club Odisha FC since its inception in 2019 and also of the I League Club Indian Arrows from 2018 until 2022. It is situated in the heart of Bhubaneswar near Nayapalli area. It has facilities for athletics, football, field hockey, tennis, table tennis, basketball, volleyball, Wall climbing and swimming. Other features of the stadium includes an 8-lane synthetic athletics track, high performance centres, and India's first Olympic standard pink and blue water-based AstroTurf.

History

The Govt of Odisha gained widespread reputation for the successful execution of the "90 Days Challenge" for hosting the 2017 Asian Athletics Championships when the former venue Ranchi backed off from hosting the event 3 months prior. The city of Bhubaneswar has been termed as the 'Sports Capital of India'  for hosting a large number as well as a wide variety of sporting events and nurturing future talents. As per a 2021 survey, Bhubaneswar was ranked 3rd among top 5 cities of India in terms of sports ecosystem and ability to host mega sporting events.

The stadium had been chosen as a venue for the 2020 FIFA U-17 Women's World Cup which was later postponed to 2021 but was cancelled due to COVID-19 pandemic and later shifted to 2022 FIFA U-17 Women's World Cup. It was initially chosen as a venue for the 2022 AFC Women's Asia Cup in 2021 but was later dropped off.

Events

International

Athletics

Football

Hockey

Tennis

Rugby

National

Multi-sport Events

Athletics

Football

Leagues

Football

Hockey

Tennis

High Performance Centres (HPCs)
 Abhinav Bindra Targeting Performance (ABTP)
 Dalmia Bharat Gopichand Badminton Academy
 JSW Swimming HPC
 Khelo India State Centre of Excellence (KISCE) for Athletics, Hockey, and Weightlifting
 KJS Ahluwalia and Tenvic Sports HPC for Weightlifting
 Odisha Naval Tata Hockey High Performance Centre (ONTHHPC)
 Odisha Aditya Birla and Gagan Narang Shooting HPC
 Reliance Foundation Odisha Athletics HPC
SAI Regional Badminton Academy
Udaan Badminton Academy
AIFF High Performance Centre

Tenants

National Teams

Hockey

Football

Tennis

References

External links 

 Odisha official website 
 India official website
 Odisha Naval Tata Hockey HPC official website

Athletics (track and field) venues in India
Field hockey venues in India
Football venues in Odisha
Tennis venues in India
Rugby union stadiums in India
Multi-purpose stadiums in India
Buildings and structures in Bhubaneswar
Sports venues in Odisha
Sports venues in Bhubaneswar
Sports venues completed in 2010
1978 establishments in Orissa
Sports venues completed in 1978
20th-century architecture in India